Apavadu (English translation: Scandal) is a 1941 Telugu Drama film directed by Gudavalli Ramabrahmam.

The plot
Prakash is a revenue inspector who happily lives with his wife Kamala, sister Kantham and son Kittu. Venkaiah and his wife Anasuya are their neighbours. Prakash has a friend Kamaraju. Anasuya has a crush on Kamaraju, but he refuses her advances. Anasuya plots revenge with the help of a local rowdy, Mangapathi. They spread rumours about an amorous relationship between Kamala and Kamaraju; as a result Kamala attempts suicide. Kamaraju, with the help of Rathnam finds out that the handwriting on the love letter supposedly written by him and that of Anasuya are similar. The truth prevails and Prakash and Kamala live happily ever after.

Cast
 Kalyanam Raghuramaiah - Kamaraju, friend of Prakash
 K. S. Prakash Rao - Prakash
 C. Lakshmi Rajyam - Kamala, wife of Prakash
 R. Balasaraswathi - Kantham, sister of Prakash
 Balamani - Rathnam
 Aveti Poornima - Anasuya, wife of Venkaiah
 S. Varalakshmi - Bobjee
 M. C. Raghavan - Venkaiah
 Maddali Krishna Murthy
 Seshagiri - Mangapathi
 Master Prabhakar - Kittu, son of  Prakash

Soundtrack
This film has 15 songs written by Basavaraju Apparao, Tapi Dharmarao and Kosaraju Raghavaiah.
 "Deva Devudow Na Nathunaku"
 "Ee Mavipai Nundi Eevu"
 "Raavalante Throve Leda"

References

External links

1941 films
1940s Telugu-language films
Indian black-and-white films
Indian drama films
1941 drama films